Henry Folliott may refer to:

Henry Folliott, 1st Baron Folliott (1568–1622) of Ireland
Henry Folliott, 3rd Baron Folliott (died 1716) of Ireland